Duplornaviricota is a phylum of RNA viruses, which contains all double-stranded RNA viruses, except for those in phylum Pisuviricota. Characteristic of the group is a viral capsid composed of 60 homo- or heterodimers of capsid protein on a pseudo-T=2 lattice. Duplornaviruses infect both prokaryotes and eukaryotes. The name of the group derives from Italian duplo which means double (a reference to double-stranded), rna for the type of virus, and -viricota which is the suffix for a virus phylum.

Classes

The following classes are recognized:

 Chrymotiviricetes
 Resentoviricetes
 Vidaverviricetes

References

Viruses